Year 1311 (MCCCXI) was a common year starting on Friday (link will display the full calendar) of the Julian calendar.

Events 
 By place 

 Europe 
 January 6 – Henry VII, the future Holy Roman Emperor, is crowned King of Italy in Milan with the Iron crown of Lombardy. The Tuscan Guelphs refuse to attend the ceremony and begin preparing for resistance against Henry's rule. Henry approves the despotic regimes of Matteo I Visconti in Milan and Cangrande I della Scala in Verona. The cities of Piedmont and Lombardy submit to Henry – in accordance with the proclaimed program of peace and justice. Florence and their Guelph (anti-imperialist) allies in Tuscany and Romagna move to defend themselves against Henry's accession.
 February 12 – Milan Uprising: German forces under Baldwin of Luxembourg (brother of Henry VII) crush the Italian Guelph troops, led by Guido della Torre in Milan. A contingent of Teutonic Knights kills and disperses most of the rebels in a single cavalry charge. Guido della Torre escapes, and is condemned to death in absence by Henry.
 March 15 – Battle of Halmyros: The Catalan Company defeats the Latin forces (some 15,000 men), and their allies under Walter V at Halmyros (southern Thessaly). After the battle, they take control of the Duchy of Athens. Later, Catalan forces peacefully occupy all of Attica and Boeotia, which they rule as part of Greece (until the 1380s).
 March 20 – King Ferdinand IV (the Summoned) grants new privileges to the Catholic Church in Castile, during an assembly at Palencia. In April, Ferdinand becomes seriously ill and is transferred to Valladolid, despite the opposition of his wife, Queen Constance, who wishes to transfer him to Carrión de los Condes (northern Spain).
 April 7 – Battle of Wopławki: The Teutonic Knights defeat the Grand Duchy of Lithuania.
 October 16 – Council of Vienne: Pope Clement V convokes a council at Vienne, France, in the presence of 20 cardinals, about 100 archbishops and bishops, and a number of abbots and priors. The main item on the agenda of the council is the Order of the Knights Templar. Clement passes papal bulls to dissolve the Templar Order, confiscate their lands, and label them as heretics.(see also 1312)

England 
 August 16 – The Parliament of England presents the Ordinances of 1311 to King Edward II (document dated 5 October; published on 11 October); these substitute the 21 Lord Ordainers for the King as the effective government of the country.
 Bolingbroke Castle passes to the House of Lancaster.
 Lincoln Cathedral in England is completed; with the spire reaching around 525 feet (160 m), it becomes the world's tallest structure (surpassing the Great Pyramid of Giza, which held the record for almost 4,000 years), a record it holds until the spire is blown down in 1549.

Births 
 March 29 – Amadeus III, Savoyan nobleman and knight (d. 1367)
 April 3 – Margaret de Bohun, English noblewoman (d. 1391)
 July 1 – Liu Bowen, Chinese statesman and politician (d. 1375)
 August 13 – Alfonso XI (the Avenger), king of Castile (d. 1350)
unknown dates
 Margaret I, German queen and Holy Roman Empress (d. 1356)
 Munenaga, Japanese nobleman, prince and priest (d. 1385)
 Peter I, Duke of Bourbon, French nobleman, knight and ambassador (d. 1356)

Deaths 
 January 27 – Külüg Khan (or Wuzong), Mongol ruler (b. 1281)
 March 3 (date buried) – Antony Bek, English bishop and patriarch (b. 1245)
 March 15 
 Walter V, French nobleman (House of Brienne) (b. 1275)
 Thomas III d'Autremencourt, Lord of Salona, Marshal of Achaea
 George I Ghisi, Triarch of Euboea, Baron of Chalandritsa, Lord of Tinos, Mykonos, Serifos and Keos
 May 29 – James II of Majorca (b. 1243)
 August 13 – Pietro Gradenigo, Doge of Venice
 September 5 – Amadeus Aba, Hungarian oligarch
 December 14 – Margaret of Brabant, German queen consort (b. 1276)
 date unknown
 David VIII of Georgia (b. 1273)
 Arnold of Villanova, Spanish alchemist and physician (b. 1235)
 Mangrai, founding king of Lan Na (b. 1238)
 probable – Bernard Saisset, Occitan bishop of Pamiers (b. 1232)

References